Philippe-Jacques Meyer (1737-1819) was a French harpist and composer. He studied theology as well as music and gave his first solo concert in Paris in 1861. He was primarily active as a teacher and composer. He traveled extensively between London, Paris and Strasbourg and settled in London in 1784.

Meyer's 1763 Essai sur la vraie manière de jouer de la harpe is a historical survey of the harp and of harp music and one of the first pedagogical harp treatises.

Treatises and Compositions 
 1763 Essai sur la vraie manière de jouer de la harpe, avec une méthode de l'accorder, op. 1
 1774 Nouvelle pour apprendre a jouer de la harpe avec la manière de l'accorder, op. 9
 Divertimenti for Flute, Harp and Violin
 Divertimenti for Harp and Violin, Op.2
 12 English Songs
 Fantasie and Larghetto with Variations
 Favorite Airs with Variations for Harp and Piano
 4 Favorite Airs with Variations for the Harp
 6 Harp Sonatas, Op.3
 Mozart's 'Forget Me Not' and 2 Waltzes
 4 Original Lessons for the Harp
 Rondo on The Italian Monfrina
 Theme and Scotch Air with Variations
 Variations on a Menuet by Exaudet
 Variations on Robin Adair
 Variations on The Bush aboon Traquair
 Variations on Ye Banks and Braes o' Bonny Doon

References

External links

1737 births
1819 deaths
People from Strasbourg
French composers
French male composers
French classical harpists